Tong'an District is a northern mainland district of Amoy which faces Quemoy County, Republic of China. To the north is Anxi and Nan'an, and to the south is Jimei. Tong'an is also east of Lianxiang and Changqin to the West. It covers 

Tong'an District has a population of 496,129 residents. (2010 Census) 

The District deserves a nickname of Silver City (銀城 POJ: Gûn-siâⁿ pinyin: Yínchéng) because the old city resembled a sycee in plan view.

Administration
Tong’an District administers two subdistricts: Datong and Xiang Ping. It has local authority over six towns. They are Hongtang, Wuxian, Dingxi, Xinming, Xike and Lianhua.

Tong'an District is also attracting foreign investment because of its status as a designated special economic zone in Xiamen.

Geography

Tong'an District is almost coterminous with the basin of the Xixi River ("Western Stream"), the largest river of Xiamen City.

The Xixi starts in the Zhaijianwei Mountains (寨尖尾山 Zhàijiānwěishān) in the northwestern part of Tong'an District, and flows in the general south-eastern direction. After receiving a number of tributaries - Lianhuaxi (莲花溪, Lotus Stream), Aoxi, Dingxi, it merges with the Dongxi (东溪, Eastern Stream) at the place called Suangxikou (双溪口, "The confluence of two streams).

The Xixi's estuary opens into the Dongzui Harbor (东咀港), which is a bay of Taiwan Strait mostly enclosed by Tong'an District and  Xiang'an District on the mainland (on the northwest and east, respectively) and by the Xiamen Island in the south. A number of large bridges have been constructed across the Xixi estuary, carrying roads and a railway between Tong'an and Xiang'an Districts (and, viewed on a larger scale, between Xiamen and Quanzhou).

History
Tong'an was made a county in AD 282 during the Jin Dynasty, but its status was revoked not long after. It was again given "county" status in AD 933 under the Later Tang administration.

Prior to 1914, its jurisdiction covered regions including present day Xiamen City, Kinmen County (ROC) and the north-eastern part of Longhai City. In May 1997, Tong'an lost its county status and became a district within Xiamen.

In September 2003, 5 towns (namely Xindian, Xinxu, Maxiang, Neicuo, and Dadeng) in the eastern and south-eastern part of the then  Tong'an District were split off,  to form the new Xiang'an District.

Economy
Tong'an has a mild sub tropical climate. This is very suitable for growing crops and plants. It is covered in natural resources such as granite, kaolin earth, mineral water and hot springs. It is emerging as a growing commercial base. The main agricultural products from Tong'an District are prawns, peanuts, longan, and pigs, fruits, vegetables, tea and herbs.

Transport 
Tong'an district is at the economic crossroad between Xiamen, Quanzhou and Zhangzhou prefecture level cities. It is an important transport hub because the Fuzhou-Xiamen and Zhangzhou-Quanzhou Highways pass directly through Tong'an District providing direct access to all the counties and villages. The Xiamen International Airport is only 27 km away. It is 32 km from the North Xiamen Freight Transport Railway Station.

Climate
Tong'an climate is subtropical, rich rainfall in mild winters and hot summers. Winters are short, roughly 25 days and summer is hot with up to 152 days. The weather is changeable in spring, and autumn is very cool. Tong'an annual average temperature is 21.86 °C The coldest temperature is 13.9 °C in January and hottest is 28.9 °C in July. The annual average rainfall is 1543.5 mm and 2030.7 hours sunlight per year. The annual average evaporation is 1685.2mm, accumulated temperature is 57.67-77.17℃. This climate is suitable for agriculture, forestry industries, animal husbandry and fisheries.

Notable people
 Koh Lay Huan (辜禮歡甲, died 1826), Chinese-born businessman who became the first Kapitan Cina (Chinese Kapitan) of Penang
 Souw Beng Kong (1580-1644), the first Kapitan Cina of Batavia

References

External links

Guide to Tongan
Xiamen government website

Geography of Xiamen
County-level divisions of Fujian